Tom Gallagher is an American politician, activist, author, and educator who served as a member of the Massachusetts House of Representatives for the 1st Suffolk district, which includes Allston–Brighton, from 1980 to 1986. After relocating to San Francisco, Gallagher had launched an unsuccessful campaign for California's 12th congressional district in 2020.

Early life and education 
Gallagher was born and raised in the South Bronx, New York City. He earned a scholarship to attend Regis High School in Manhattan, and later earned a Bachelor of Arts in Philosophy from Boston College.

Career 
Gallagher ran unsuccessfully for the Massachusetts House of Representatives in 1978, losing narrowly to a 14-year incumbent. Gallagher defeated the incumbent in a 1980 rematch election, and represented the Allston–Brighton neighborhood of Boston until 1986. A member of the Boston chapter of Democratic Socialists of America, Gallagher was the first declared socialist state legislator in Massachusetts since the 1920s.

After leaving office, Gallagher relocated to San Francisco and became involved in local progressive politics. Gallagher worked in the campaign for Proposition 186, which would have established a single-payer healthcare system in the state. He also worked on implementation of the Humphrey–Hawkins Full Employment Act. Gallagher also worked as a substitute teacher in  San Francisco and South San Francisco, California. Gallagher was a candidate for California's 12th congressional district in 2020, campaigning as a progressive alternative to Nancy Pelosi. Gallagher has contributed articles to Common Dreams and has been profiled in Jacobin.

See also
List of Democratic Socialists of America who have held office in the United States

References 

Members of the Massachusetts House of Representatives
Politicians from the Bronx
Morrissey College of Arts & Sciences alumni
Democratic Socialists of America politicians from Massachusetts
Activists from the San Francisco Bay Area
New York (state) Democrats
New York (state) socialists
Massachusetts Democrats
Massachusetts socialists
California Democrats
California socialists
Candidates in the 2020 United States elections
Living people
Year of birth missing (living people)